Jed's Trip to the Fair is a 1916 silent film comedy directed by Al Christie and starring Eddie Lyons, Lee Moran and Betty Compson. It was produced by Nestor Film Company and released through Universal Film Manufacturing Company.

Cast
Eddie Lyons - Jed
Lee Moran - Mysterious Stranger
Betty Compson - Lizzie
Joe Janecke - Thief
Ethel Lynne

See also
 Betty Compson filmography

References

External links
 Jed's Trip to the Fair at IMDb.com

1916 films
American silent short films
American black-and-white films
Films directed by Al Christie
Universal Pictures short films
Silent American comedy films
1916 comedy films
1910s American films